is a train station on the  Osaka Metro Tanimachi Line located in Hirano-ku, Osaka, Japan.

Lines
Nagahara Station is served by the Osaka Metro Tanimachi Line (Station Number: T35)

Layout
There is an island platform with two tracks underground.

External links

 Official Site 
 Official Site 

Hirano-ku, Osaka
Railway stations in Osaka
Railway stations in Japan opened in 1980
Osaka Metro stations